USS Tillman has been the name of two ships in the United States Navy.  Both are named for Senator Benjamin Tillman.

United States Navy ship names
Benjamin Tillman